Morgan Stéphane Sanson (born 18 August 1994) is a French professional footballer who plays as a midfielder for Ligue 1 club Strasbourg, on loan from Premier League club Aston Villa.

Early life
Sanson was born in Saint-Doulchard, Cher.

Club career

Le Mans
Ahead of the 2012–13 season, Sanson was promoted to the senior team by manager Denis Zanko and assigned the number 25 shirt. He made his professional debut on 3 August 2012 in a league match against Dijon, replacing Idrissa Sylla with only ten minutes to play. He scored his first league goal on 22 December 2012 against Monaco in a 2–3 home loss.

Montpellier
On 12 June 2013, Sanson signed a four-year contract with Montpellier for a reported fee of €700,000. He made his debut for the club on 14 September 2013, in a 0–0 draw against Stade de Reims.

Marseille

On 17 January 2017, Sanson joined south coast rivals Marseille by signing a four-and-a-half-year contract, for an initial fee estimated to be €9 million, plus €3 million in bonuses. On 5 March 2017, he scored a goal in the 56th minute in a 4–1 Ligue 1 away win against Lorient - his first Ligue 1 goal for Marseille.

On 3 May 2018, he played in the Europa League semi-finals away to FC Red Bull Salzburg as Marseille played out a 1–2 away loss but a 3–2 aggregate win to secure a place in the 2018 UEFA Europa League Final which was played at the Parc Olympique Lyonnais, and saw his team lose to Atlético Madrid.

Aston Villa 
On 26 January 2021, Sanson signed for English Premier League side Aston Villa on a -year contract, for a fee believed to be £14 million, with £1.5 million in add-ons. On 3 February 2021, Sanson made his Aston Villa debut as a late substitute in a 3–1 defeat to West Ham at Villa Park. On 4 April 2021, Sanson suffered a knee injury midway through the second half in a 3–1 victory over Fulham which ended his season prematurely. 

On 31 August 2021, Sanson made his return from injury as one of the permitted overage players for Aston Villa U21s, in a 3–1 victory over Wycombe Wanderers in the EFL Trophy. On 22 September 2021, Sanson returned to the first team in an EFL Cup tie against Chelsea – but he was forced to leave the field before half time after a recurrence of his injury. The arrival of Steven Gerrard as Aston Villa manager coincided with Sanson regaining fitness and he started in the Premier League for the first time in 8 months on 26 December 2021. Gerrard described how Sanson had been disappointed with the start to his English football career, but he had assured him that he was aware of his talent, despite Sanson's fleeting appearances up until that point.

In newly appointed manager Unai Emery's first match for Villa, on 6 November 2022, Sanson made his first appearance of the 2022–23 campaign, coming on as a substitute in the 90th minute as Villa defeated Manchester United 3–1. On 8 January 2023, Sanson scored his first goal for Aston Villa in a 2–1 defeat to lower league Stevenage in the FA Cup.

Strasbourg 
On 23 January 2023, Sanson joined Strasbourg on loan until the end of the current season.

International career
Sanson is a France youth international having represented his nation at under-19 and under-21 level.

Career statistics

Honours
Marseille
UEFA Europa League runner-up: 2017–18

References

External links

Profile at the Aston Villa F.C. website
 
 

1994 births
Living people
Sportspeople from Cher (department)
French footballers
France youth international footballers
France under-21 international footballers
Association football midfielders
Le Mans FC players
Montpellier HSC players
Olympique de Marseille players
Aston Villa F.C. players
Ligue 2 players
Ligue 1 players
Premier League players
French expatriate footballers
Expatriate footballers in England
French expatriate sportspeople in England
Footballers from Centre-Val de Loire
RC Strasbourg Alsace players